This is a list of Live! with Kelly and Live with Kelly and Michael episodes which were broadcast during the show's 25th season.  The list is ordered by air date.

Although the co-hosts may have read a couple of emails during the broadcast, it does not necessarily count as an "Inbox" segment.

LIVE! with Kelly

September 2012

Live with Kelly and Michael

September 2012

October 2012

November 2012

December 2012

January 2013

February 2013

March 2013

April 2013

May 2013

June 2013

July 2013

August 2013

References 

2012 American television seasons
2013 American television seasons